Darvel Football Club are a Scottish football club based in the town of Darvel, Ayrshire.

History
The club reached the final of the 1975–76 Scottish Junior Cup, but were beaten 3–0 by Bo'ness United.

Darvel won the Ayrshire District League title in 2016–17 to gain promotion to the West Super League First Division (renamed as the West Championship), the second tier of the SJFA West Region league structure.

The team was managed from June 2013 to November 2017 by Scott Clelland. On 14 February 2019, Darvel announced that Mick Kennedy would be the new manager for the season 2019–20.

The club and Blantyre Victoria were declared joint-winners of the West Region Championship in 2019–20 after the season was prematurely halted by the COVID-19 pandemic.

Darvel joined the West of Scotland Football League in 2020–21 along with all other West Region junior clubs, and were promoted to the Premier Division for the inaugural season. In the first full season they won the Premier Division in 2021–22.

On 23 January 2023, Darvel pulled off one of the biggest shocks in Scottish Cup history, as they beat Premiership side Aberdeen 1–0 in the fourth round at Recreation Park.

Players

Current squad

Out on loan

Honours 
Senior
West of Scotland League Premier Division
 Champions: 2021–22

Junior
Scottish Junior Cup
 Runners-up: 1975–76

West Region Championship
 Joint-winners: 2019–20

Ayrshire District League
 Winners: 2016–17

References

External links 
 Facebook
 Twitter

 
Football clubs in Scotland
Scottish Junior Football Association clubs
Association football clubs established in 1889
Football in East Ayrshire
1889 establishments in Scotland
Darvel
West of Scotland Football League teams